Rasmus Thelander (born 9 July 1991) is a Danish professional footballer who plays as a centre-back for Aalborg BK.

Club career

AB
Thelander began his career as a senior footballer in 2010 for Akademisk Boldklub (AB) in Danish 1st Division, the second-tier league in Danish football.

AaB
In the summer of 2012, Thelander signed a two-year contract with the Danish Superliga club AaB.

Thelander played his first season in AaB primarily as a substitute. In the 2013–14 season he made his Superliga breakthrough, as defender Lasse Nielsen left for the Dutch team NEC Nijmegen, thus leaving a spot open in the centre of defense. Afterwards, Thelander would play each league game through the rest of the season and help his club win the first Danish double.

Thelander scored two goals in the 4–2 victory over Copenhagen in the Danish cup final and won the Danish Cup Fighter of the Year (årets pokalfighter).

Panathinaikos
Thelander signed a deal with the Greek team Panathinaikos on 2 July 2015. According to several Greek press sources he was offered a four-year contract having been recommended to Panathinaikos by René Henriksen, a former player with the club. Thelander had been courted in the previous season when he helped lead AaB win the double.

Αfter a pre-season injury, he made his debut against Levadiakos on 23 September 2015. On 3 October 2015, during his third appearance with the club he scored his first goal in a 1–0 away win against Skoda Xanthi, with a header after a corner kick.

On 26 July 2017, Thelander was the fifth footballer (after Michael Essien, Stathis Tavlaridis, Jens Wemmer and Niklas Hult) in eight months to file an appeal against Panathinaikos for payments' delay. In his appeal, he claimed an amount of €510,000 that covered the following year's contract as well. On 14 August 2017, the committee of the Greek Football Federation's financial disputes gave him the amount of €450,000.

FC Zürich
On 15 August 2017, Thelander signed a two-year contract with Swiss club FC Zürich. He won the 2017–18 Swiss Cup with Zürich.

Vitesse
On 17 May 2018, it was announced that Thelander would join Dutch side Vitesse on a three-year deal in July 2018. On 26 July, he made his first appearance for Vitesse, starting in the first leg of their UEFA Europa League qualification round against Viitorul Constanța. On 23 August, news broke that Thelander had broken his ankle, keeping him off the field for some months. However, due to a quick recovery, he made his comeback in the first team on 3 November in a 1–0 loss against PSV Eindhoven. He made just 13 appearances in his sole season in Arnhem.

Return to AaB
On 22 August 2019, Thelander moved back to AaB on a three-year contract.

Ferencváros
On 23 May 2022, Thelander joined Hungarian club Ferencvárosi TC. On 18 November 2022, Ferencváros terminated Thelander's contract due to family reasons.

Third spell with AaB
On the same day, Thelander signed with AaB on a four-year deal.

Career statistics

Honours
AaB
Danish Superliga: 2013–14
Danish Cup: 2014

FC Zürich
Swiss Cup: 2017–18

Individual
2014 Danish Cup Fighter of the year (årets pokalfighter)

References

External links

nordjyske.dk 

1991 births
Living people
Danish men's footballers
Danish expatriate men's footballers
Denmark youth international footballers
Footballers from Copenhagen
Association football defenders
Danish Superliga players
Super League Greece players
Swiss Super League players
Eredivisie players
AaB Fodbold players
Panathinaikos F.C. players
FC Zürich players
SBV Vitesse players
Ferencvárosi TC footballers
Expatriate footballers in Greece
Expatriate footballers in Switzerland
Expatriate footballers in the Netherlands
Expatriate footballers in Hungary
Danish expatriate sportspeople in Greece
Danish expatriate sportspeople in Switzerland
Danish expatriate sportspeople in the Netherlands
Danish expatriate sportspeople in Hungary